AFS is an initialism that may refer to:

Computing
 Andrew File System, a distributed networked file system
 OpenAFS, an open source implementation of the Andrew File System
 Apple File Service, implementing the Apple Filing Protocol
 Apple File System, Apple's proprietary file system
 AtheOS File System, part of the Syllable operating system

Education
 AFS Intercultural Programs, formerly American Field Service
 Abington Friends School, in Jenkintown, Pennsylvania, United States

Military
 Army Fire Service, UK
 Air force station

Organizations
 Alternative for Sweden, a political party in Sweden
 American Folklore Society
 American Foundry Society
  (AfS), a workgroup of the German National Library (DNB)
 Association of Football Statisticians, UK
 Australian Flag Society
 Auxiliary Fire Service, UK and Ireland

Places
 Afs, Idlib, a Syrian village
 Ashford railway station (Surrey) (station code:AFS), Middlesex, UK

Other
 Advanced front-lighting system (AFS) or Adaptative Front-lighting System, for automotive headlamps
 Aeronautical fixed service, for air navigation
 Afghan afghani, unit of currency
 Afro-Seminole Creole language (ISO 639-3: oafs)
 AFS Trinity, a US company
 Allergic fungal sinusitis
 Alternative financial service
 Atomic fluorescence spectroscopy
 Available for sale, an accounting term
 International Convention on the Control of Harmful Anti-fouling Systems on Ships, 2001
 Nikon AF-S, a type of Nikon F-mount lens